Robert Bryan Massie (October 13, 1896 – September 5, 1961) was an American politician who served in the Virginia House of Delegates, representing his native Louisa County.

References

External links 

1896 births
1961 deaths
Democratic Party members of the Virginia House of Delegates
20th-century American politicians
People from Louisa, Virginia